Kirtankhola is a river that starts at Sayeshtabad, in the district of Barisal, Bangladesh, and ends in Gajalia, near the Gabkhan canal.

See also
 List of rivers of Bangladesh

References

Rivers of Bangladesh
Bay of Bengal
Rivers of Barisal Division
Barisal
Barishal District
Rivers of Dhaka Division